This is about the politician. For the fictional character, see Splatterhouse''. For the American college football coach, see Rick Taylor (American football). For the radio personality also known as Rick Taylor, see Rick Emerson.

Rick Taylor  is a former Democratic member of the Pennsylvania House of Representatives for the 151st legislative district. He was elected in 2006.
Taylor attended University of Minnesota and interned for Minnesota House of Representatives and with Paul Wellstone. He earned a master's degree in Industrial and Labor Relations from Cornell University and worked as Manager of Compensation for IMS Health. He served as a member of the Ambler, Pennsylvania Borough Council prior to his election in 2006, when he defeated incumbent Eugene McGill. He lost re-election in 2010 to Republican Todd Stephens. His wife Jeanne Sorg is the current mayor of Ambler, Pennsylvania.

Recent Legislation 

Taylor sponsored a bill that would expand the number of businesses covered under the Small Business First Program. The bill would increase the number of businesses that receive funding; under current legislation, only businesses with fewer than 100 employees are eligible for aid. The legislation will help more small businesses to prosper and grow.

On June 8, 2010 Rick Taylor sponsored H.B. 1926, which requires all homeless sex offenders to register in their local "hang outs." The bill corrects a previous loophole in Megan's Law, in which homeless sex offenders would fail to register because they lacked a permanent residence.

Taylor co-sponsored legislation to help prevent previously unaddressed forms of school bullying, including "cyber bullying" and harassment. The bill gives guidelines to each school's administration to deal with these incidents; also, the Department of Education is required to regularly evaluate each school's bullying policy and report back to the General Assembly. School districts that fail to comply with these regulations risk losing their Safe School funding from the state of Pennsylvania.

References

External links
Pennsylvania House of Representatives - Rick Taylor  official PA House website
Pennsylvania House Democratic Caucus - Rick Taylor  official caucus website
Taylor for PA official campaign site (archived)

Living people
University of Minnesota alumni
Members of the Pennsylvania House of Representatives
Cornell University School of Industrial and Labor Relations alumni
Year of birth missing (living people)